Alexander Bradshaw Campbell  (born December 1, 1933) is a former politician of Prince Edward Island, Canada. He is the son of former premier Thane A. Campbell and Cecilia L. Bradshaw. He entered politics by winning a seat in the legislature through a 1965 by-election in 5th Prince. Later the same year he was elected leader of the PEI Liberal Party and, in 1966 took the party to power becoming, at 32, one of the youngest premiers ever elected in Canada. He also held the position of Attorney-General from 1966 until 1969.

Education 
Campbell attended Dalhousie University, where he earned a Bachelor of Arts degree and a law degree, and, in 1959, he passed the bar in Prince Edward Island.  In 1971 he was recognized as a "Significant Sig" by the Sigma Chi fraternity, of which he is a member.

Political career 
Campbell's government attempted to strengthen the province's economy and improve social conditions by instituting programs such as assistance to homeowners and homebuilders. His government also revamped the educational system and established the PEI Heritage Foundation.  He also started the Land Development Corporation and the PEI Lending Authority to help develop the economy. The government also brought in controls on absentee ownership of land.

Legal career 
Campbell left politics in 1978 to sit on the province's Supreme Court. Campbell delivered judgment in Government of P.E.I. v Walker in 1992, whose 1995 appeal has been cited in more than fifty subsequent cases.

Personal life 
A long-time resident of his hometown of Summerside, Campbell was a member of Scouts Canada and later served as a Scout Leader.  In his retirement, Campbell now resides in Stanley Bridge during the summer months and is a part-time winter resident of St. Petersburg, Florida, where he has organized a "Prince Edward Island Picnic" at Desoto Park on the second Sunday of March every year since 2000.

Campbell was appointed to the Order of Canada in 2013.

Notes

References 

1933 births
Living people
Dalhousie University alumni
Schulich School of Law alumni
Justices of the Supreme Court of Prince Edward Island
Members of the Order of Prince Edward Island
Members of the King's Privy Council for Canada
Members of the United Church of Canada
Officers of the Order of Canada
People from Summerside, Prince Edward Island
Premiers of Prince Edward Island
Prince Edward Island Liberal Party MLAs
Prince Edward Island Liberal Party leaders